The Chinese Ambassador to Australia is the official representative of the People's Republic of China to the Commonwealth of Australia.

Ambassadors of the Republic of China (1941–1972)

Ambassadors of the People's Republic of China (1973–present)

See also
 List of ambassadors of Australia to China

References
 Resources > Diplomatic Figures > Ambassadors > North America and Oceania: Ministry of Foreign Affairs of the People's Republic of China

Australia
China